Unedogemmula indica, common name the Indian turrid,  is a species of sea snail, a marine gastropod mollusk in the family Turridae, the turrids.

There is one subspecies: Lophiotoma indica queenslandica Olivera, 2004 (as of 2021, not yet renamed)

Description
The size of an adult shell varies between 35 mm and 90 mm. The fusiform shell is somewhat less ridged and striated and has a long siphonal canal. The shoulder angle is very slight, the central ridge forming a carina. The other revolving ridges are smaller and closer than other species in this genus. The color of the shell is yellowish-brown, sometimes indistinctly marbled or variegated.

The length of the fusiform shell is 65 mm, the diameter 20 mm. The shell is covered with sharply carinated whorls, the carina (= a prominent knife-edge ridge) consisting of a pair of narrow ribs. The whole surface is covered with close, raised revolving lines, of which two or three below the carina are more prominent. The color of the shell is whitish with minutely numerously brown-spots and with usually a row of larger spots below the suture.

Distribution
This marine species occurs in the Mascarene Basin and off Madagascar; off Sri Lanka, the Philippines, in the South China Sea, off Australia and the Fiji Islands.

References

 Drivas, J. & M. Jay (1988). Coquillages de La Réunion et de l'île Maurice

External links
 Röding P.F. (1798). Museum Boltenianum sive Catalogus cimeliorum e tribus regnis naturæ quæ olim collegerat Joa. Fried Bolten, M. D. p. d. per XL. annos proto physicus Hamburgensis. Pars secunda continens Conchylia sive Testacea univalvia, bivalvia & multivalvia. Trapp, Hamburg. viii, 199 pp.
 Sowerby, G. B., III. (1888). Description of sixteen new species of shells. Proceedings of the Zoological Society of London. 1888: 207-213, pl. 11.
 Puillandre N., Fedosov A.E., Zaharias P., Aznar-Cormano L. & Kantor Y.I. (2017). A quest for the lost types of Lophiotoma (Gastropoda: Conoidea: Turridae): integrative taxonomy in a nomenclatural mess. Zoological Journal of the Linnean Society. 181: 243-271

indica
Gastropods described in 1798